The 17479 / 17480 Puri–Tirupati Express is an Express train belonging to South Coast Railway zone that runs between  and  in India. It is currently being operated with 17479/17480 train numbers on weekly basis.

Service

The 17479/Puri–Tirupati Express has an average speed of 44 km/hr and covers 1233 km in 28h 5m. The 17480/Tirupati–Puri Express has an average speed of 44 km/hr and covers 1233 km in 28h 5m.

Route & Halts 

The important halts of the train are:

Coach composition

The train has standard ICF rakes with max speed of 110 kmph. The train consists of 16 coaches:

 1 AC II Tier
 2 AC III Tier
 6 Sleeper coaches
 5 General
 2 Seating cum Luggage Rake

Traction

From Visakhapatnam to  it is hauled by WDM-3D / WDM-3A of Guntakal / Visakhapatnam shed and from Vijayawada to Tirupati both trains are hauled by a Vijayawada-based WAP-4 / Lallaguda-based WAP-7 electric locomotive and vice versa.

Direction reversal

The train reverses its direction 2 times:

Rake sharing

The train shares its rake with 17481/17482 Bilaspur–Tirupati Express.

See also 

 Puri railway station
 Tirupati railway station
 Bilaspur–Tirupati Express

Notes

References

External links 

Transport in Tirupati
Transport in Puri
Express trains in India
Rail transport in Odisha
Rail transport in Andhra Pradesh
Railway services introduced in 1992